John Thomas Surman (second ¼ 1883 – first ¼ 1948) was an English professional rugby league footballer who played in the 1900s and 1910s. Prior to Tuesday 27 August 1895, Bradford F.C. was a rugby union club, it then became a rugby league club, and since 1907 it has been the association football (soccer) club Bradford Park Avenue.

Background
Thomas Surman's birth was registered in Bradford district, West Riding of Yorkshire, England, and his death aged 64 was registered in Bradford district, West Riding of Yorkshire, England.

Playing career

International honours
Tom Surman won a cap for England while at Bradford F.C., he played  against Other Nationalities during 1906.

County honours
Tom Surman won cap(s) for Yorkshire while at Bradford FC, including against New Zealand at Belle Vue, Wakefield on Wednesday 18 December 1907.

Championship final appearances
Tom Surman played  in Bradford FC's 5-0 victory over Salford in the Championship tiebreaker during the 1903–04 season at Thrum Hall, Hanson Lane, Halifax on Thursday 28 April 1904, in front of a crowd of 12,000.

Challenge Cup Final appearances
Tom Surman was a reserve to travel, with George Marsden playing  and S. Brear playing , in Bradford FC's 5-0 victory over Salford in the 1906 Challenge Cup Final during the 1905-06 season at Headingley Rugby Stadium, Leeds, in front of a crowd of 15,834.

County Cup Final appearances
Tom Surman played  in Hull Kingston Rovers' 10-22 defeat by Huddersfield in the 1911–12 Yorkshire County Cup Final during the 1911–12 season at Belle Vue, Wakefield on Saturday 25 November 1911, in front of a crowd of 20,000.

Genealogical information
Tom Surman's marriage to Gertrude (née Tetley) was registered during second ¼ 1919 in Bradford district

References

External links
[http://www.rlhp.co.uk/imagedetail.asp?id=1432 Image 
[http://www.rlhp.co.uk/imagedetail.asp?id=1433 Image 

1883 births
1948 deaths
Bradford Bulls players
Bradford F.C. players
England national rugby league team players
English rugby league players
Hull Kingston Rovers players
Rugby league five-eighths
Rugby league halfbacks
Rugby league players from Bradford
Yorkshire rugby league team players